The women's 50 metre rifle three positions shooting event at the 2011 Pan American Games was held on October 22 at the Jalisco Hunting Club in Guadalajara. The defending Pan American Games champion is Jamie Beyerle of the United States.

The event consisted of two rounds: a qualifier and a final. In the qualifier, each shooter fired 60 shots with a .22 Long Rifle at 50 metres distance. 20 shots were fired each from the standing, kneeling, and prone positions. Scores for each shot were in increments of 1, with a maximum score of 10.

The top 8 shooters in the qualifying round moved on to the final round. There, they fired an additional 10 shots, all from the standing position. These shots scored in increments of .1, with a maximum score of 10.9. The total score from all 70 shots was used to determine final ranking.

Schedule
All times are Central Standard Time (UTC-6).

Records
The existing world and Pan American Games records were as follows.

Results

Qualification round
24 athletes from 14 countries competed.

Final

References

Shooting at the 2011 Pan American Games
Pan